"Gasoline" is a song by American band Haim from their third studio album Women in Music, Pt. III (2020). The song was written by the band members along with Rostam Batmanglij, and produced by Batmanglij, Danielle Haim, and Ariel Rechtshaid. A remix of "Gasoline" with American singer-songwriter Taylor Swift was included as one of two bonus tracks of the album's expanded edition. The remix was released as a single on February 19, 2021, by Columbia Records. It marks Haim's second collaboration with Swift, following "No Body, No Crime" on Swift's  Evermore (2020).

Background
Haim first shared the song in a live performance on Instagram on June 18, 2020, less than a week before the album's release.

In December 2020, Haim contributed featured vocals to the song "No Body, No Crime", the second single from Taylor Swift's 2020 studio album, Evermore. When Haim began to work on the expanded edition of Women in Music Pt. III, they reached out to Swift to contribute vocals to "Gasoline" as she had previously told them that "Gasoline" was her favourite song on the album. In an Instagram post about the collaboration they said that Swift "brought such amazing ideas and new imagery to the song and truly gave it a new life". In February 2021, Haim posted a photo across social media, in which the three sisters stand in a gas station, in black, Amélie-inspired wigs with asymmetrical bangs. Fans noticed a petrol pump labelled "13" in the background and associated it with Swift's favorite number, 13. The band teased fans a potential collaboration with Swift again, via videos on TikTok.

The remix of "Gasoline" featuring Swift was included on the expanded edition of Women in Music Pt. III. The song is three minutes and 13 seconds in length.

Composition
"Gasoline" is a "dreamy, guitar-sliding" "truly sensual slow jam that was made for making out all night in the car". Lyrically, the song contains lyrics about Danielle Haim's depression, with her "pleading to get out from under". Musically, "Gasoline" is a pop rock song. The song is three minutes and 18 seconds in length.

Live performances

On August 20, 2020, "Gasoline" was performed on the Grammy Awards' "Press Play" show.
On September 29, 2020, Haim performed the song remotely on Jimmy Kimmel Live! in the empty parking lot of The Forum in Los Angeles. They performed the song on CBS This Morning on November 28, 2020. Swift, in a surprise appearance, joined the band at the O2 in London on their One More Haim Tour to perform the "Gasoline" remix mashed-up with Swift's "Love Story".

Credits and personnel
Credits adapted from Tidal.

 Alana Haim – lead vocals, songwriting, electric guitar
 Danielle Haim – lead vocals, songwriting, production, drums, electric guitar
 Este Haim – lead vocals, songwriting, bass
 Taylor Swift – lead vocals (remix only)
 Rostam Batmanglij – songwriting, production, accordion, acoustic guitar, bass, electric guitar, engineering
 Ariel Rechtshaid – production, engineering, guitar, programming
 Emily Lazar – mastering
 Tom Elmhirst – mixing
 Chris Rowe – engineering (remix only)
 Dave Schiffman – engineering
 Jasmine Chen – engineering
 Joey Messina-Doerning – engineering
 John DeBold – engineering
 Matt DiMona – engineering
 Chris Allgood – assistant engineering

Charts

Original version

Taylor Swift remix

Release history

References

External links
 
 

2020 songs
2021 singles
Haim (band) songs
Song recordings produced by Ariel Rechtshaid
American pop rock songs
Song recordings produced by Rostam Batmanglij
Songs about depression
Songs written by Alana Haim
Songs written by Danielle Haim
Songs written by Este Haim
Songs written by Rostam Batmanglij
Taylor Swift songs